Spole  is a settlement in the administrative district of Gmina Dębnica Kaszubska, within Słupsk County, Pomeranian Voivodeship, in northern Poland.

History
For the history of the region, see History of Pomerania.

Demographics
The settlement has a population of 11 people.

References

Spole